The Croatian Maritime Museum is a maritime museum in Split, Croatia. The museum is located in a 19th-century building, itself built within the 17th-century Gripe Fortress. The museum was established in 1997 as a successor to the Military-Maritime Museum established by the Yugoslav Navy in 1960 while also inheriting the collection of the Maritime Museum of the Yugoslav Academy of Sciences and Arts which existed between 1956 and 1985.

Footnotes

References 

Museums in Split, Croatia
1997 establishments in Croatia
Museums established in 1997